The Phipps–McElveen Building at 525–529 Penn Avenue in downtown Pittsburgh, Pennsylvania, USA

History
The building was built in 1896 by Henry Phipps Jr., an early business partner of Andrew Carnegie, real estate developer, and philanthropist. 

The building served as the location of the McElveen furniture store for about 20 years. By 1919 it was occupied by a clothier, Oppenhiem, Collins & Company, who stayed there until the late 1930s. 

Thereafter it was occupied by Walgreens, another furniture store, and a recreation center.

The building was added to the National Register of Historic Places on May 5, 2000.

See also

References

Buildings and structures in Pittsburgh
Commercial buildings completed in 1896
Commercial buildings on the National Register of Historic Places in Pennsylvania
National Register of Historic Places in Pittsburgh
Phipps family